Virtual queue is a concept used in inbound call centers. Call centers use an Automatic Call Distributor (ACD) to distribute incoming calls to specific resources (agents) in the center. ACDs hold queued calls in First In, First Out order until agents become available. From the caller’s perspective, without virtual queuing they have only two choices: wait until an agent resource becomes available, or abandon (hang up) and try again later. From the call center’s perspective, a long queue results in many abandoned calls, repeat attempts, and customer dissatisfaction.

Virtual queue systems allow customers to receive callbacks instead of waiting in an ACD queue. This solution is analogous to the “fast lane” option (e.g. Disney's FastPass) used at amusement parks, which often have long queues to ride the various coasters and attractions. A computerized system allows park visitors to secure their place in a “virtual queue” rather than waiting in a physical queue.

In brick-and-mortar retail and the business world, virtual queuing for large organizations similar to the FastPass and Six Flags' Flash Pass, have been in use successfully since 1999 and 2001 respectively. For small businesses, the virtual queue management solutions come in two types: (a) based on SMS text notification and (b) apps on smartphones and tablet devices, with in-app notification and remote queue status views.

Overview
While there are several different varieties of virtual queuing systems, a standard First In, First Out that maintains the customer's place in line is set to monitor queue conditions until the Estimated Wait Time (EWT) exceeds a predetermined threshold. When the threshold is exceeded, the system intercepts incoming calls before they enter the queue. It informs customers of their EWT and offers the option of receiving a callback in the same amount of time as if they waited on hold.

If customers choose to remain in a queue (also known as que or q for short), their calls are routed directly to the queue. Customers who opt for a callback are prompted to enter their phone number and then hang up the phone. A “virtual placeholder” maintains the customers' position in the queue while the ACD queue is worked off. The virtual queuing system monitors the rate at which calls in queue are worked off and launches an outbound call to the customer moments before the virtual placeholder is due to reach the top of the queue. When the callback is answered by the customer, the system asks for confirmation that the correct person is on the line and ready to speak with an agent. Upon receiving confirmation, the system routes the call to the next available agent resource, who handles it as a normal inbound call.

Call centers don't measure this "virtual queue" time as "queue time" because the caller is free to pursue other activities instead of listening to hold music and announcements. The voice circuit is released between the ACD and the telecommunications network, so the call does not accrue any queue time or telecommunications charges.

Universal Queue
Universal queue (UQ) is concept in contact center design whereby multiple communications channels (such as telephone, fax and email) are integrated into a single 'universal queue' to standardize processing and handling, enabling coherent customer relations management (CRM).

The immediate benefits of UQ include standardised routing, recording, handling, reporting, and management of all communications in a contact center (or across an entire organisation). These benefits may create others, such as increased sales, reduced overheads, cost savings and an improvement in relationships with customers and suppliers.

Although UQ was discussed at least as far back as 2004, the difficulties in implementing such a system seem to have prevented its widespread uptake. As of 2008, there is little data available online regarding existing UQ implementations.

Applications
Some utility companies (electric, natural gas, telecommunications, and cable television) use virtual queuing to manage seasonal peaks in call center traffic, as well as unexpected traffic spikes due to weather or service interruptions. Call centers that process inbound telesales calls can reduce the number of abandoned calls. Customer care organizations use virtual queuing to enhance service levels and increase customer loyalty. Insurance claims processing centers use virtual queuing to manage unforeseen peaks due to natural disasters.

Various amusement parks around the world have employed a similar virtual queue system for guests wishing to queue for their amusement rides. One of the most notable examples is Disney's Fastpass which issues guests a ticket which details a time for the guest to return and board the attraction. More recent virtual queue system have utilised technology, such as the Q-Bot, to reserve a place for them in the queue. Implementations of such a system include the Q-Bot at Legoland parks, the Flash Pass at Six Flags parks and the Q4U at Dreamworld.

Virtual queueing apps allow small businesses to operate their virtual queue from an app. Their customers can take virtual queue number remotely and wait remotely instead of waiting on-premises.

During the Covid-19 pandemic, virtual queuing became necessary to ensure retailers could provide a safe experience to customers while their store capacity was limited. Companies such as Qudini have provided customers a way to join a queue by scanning a QR code, allowing them to wait at a safe distance from other customers.

References

Dan Merriman, The Total Economic Impact Of Virtual Hold’s Virtual Queuing Solutions, Forrester Research, 2006
David Maister, The Psychology Of Waiting In Lines, 1985
Mukta Kampllikar, Losing Wait, TMTC Journal of Management, 2005
Greg Levin, The Viability of Virtual Queuing Tools, CallCenter Magazine, 2006
Eric Camulli, How to Optimize Skills-Based Routing Using a Virtual Queue, Connections Magazine, Jan/Feb 2007
Jon Arnold, Virtual Queuing – the End of Music on Hold?, Focus, Dec 2010
Shai Berger, Virtual Queuing Reaches A Turning Point, April 2012
Padraig McTiernan, The Business Case for Virtual Queueing, June 2012
Tom Oristian, Virtual Queuing Simulator, Aug 2012

Computer telephony integration
Telemarketing